Steffen Nkansah (born 7 April 1996) is a German professional footballer who plays as a defender for Erzgebirge Aue.

Career
Nkansah joined Eintracht Braunschweig in 2017 from Borussia Mönchengladbach II. He made his professional debut on 18 August 2017, in a 2. Bundesliga match against FC Erzgebirge Aue.

Personal life
Nkansah was born in Münster to a German mother and a Ghanaian father.

References

External links
 

1996 births
Living people
Sportspeople from Münster
German footballers
Germany youth international footballers
German sportspeople of Ghanaian descent
Association football defenders
Borussia Mönchengladbach II players
Eintracht Braunschweig II players
Eintracht Braunschweig players
FSV Zwickau players
FC Erzgebirge Aue players
Regionalliga players
2. Bundesliga players
3. Liga players
Footballers from North Rhine-Westphalia